The 1991 Belgian Challenge (also referred to as the 1991 555 Belgian Challenge for the purposes of sponsorship) was an invitational non-ranking snooker tournament held at the Matchroom Schijnpoort, Antwerp from 18 to 21 December 1991. Steve Davis won the title, defeating Stephen Hendry 10–9 in the final.

In the first round, Hendry set a record for the quickest best-of-nine  match by beating Mike Henson 5–0 in 51 minutes. Henson scored only ten points in the match. In the quarter-finals, Hendry whitewashed his opponent Gary Wilkinson, who had won the World Matchplay tournament five days previously, with Wilkinson scoring just 40 points across the first four of the five frames. In the semi-final, Hendry was on track for his first competitive maximum break by potting fourteen  and fourteen , but then  himself on the final red and did not pot it. Later in the match, Hallett also potted fourteen reds and blacks, but he missed a pot on the final red.

In the final, Davis trailed 3–6, but later led 8–7 after compiling breaks of 78, 102, 56 and 102. Hendry made it 8–8 with a break of 120, before Davis won the following frame. Davis won the last frame, making a break of 66, to win the title.

Results

References

1991 in snooker
Sport in Belgium